Mount Burke may refer to:

Mount Burke (Alberta)
Mount Burke (British Columbia)

See also
Burke Mountain